The Federal University of São João del-Rei (UFSJ) is a Brazilian university in the city of São João del-Rei in the state of Minas Gerais. It has other campuses in the cities of Ouro Branco, Divinópolis and Sete Lagoas, all of them in the state of Minas Gerais.

It was founded as a school in 1987 and reorganized as a university in 2002. The university offers over 30 bachelor's degree programs and more than 20 graduate degree programs.

History

The university was created by the law 7,555 of 28 December 1986 with the name of São João del-Rei College Foundation (Fundação de Ensino Superior de São João del-Rei), also called FUNREI. It was the result of the union of three colleges: Dom Bosco College of Philosophy, Science and Languages (Faculdade Dom Bosco de Filosofia, Ciências e Letras), College of Economics, Business and Accounting (Faculdade de Ciências Econômicas, Administrativas e Contábeis) and College of Industrial Engineering (Faculdade de Engenharia Industrial).

FUNREI became a university through the law 10,425, of 19 of April 2002 and it was called Federal University of São João del-Rei. UFSJ is the common accepted abbreviation.

Organization

UFSJ consists of six campuses and five special units. The campuses and special unities are property of UFSJ or are under its responsibility.
 Campus Alto Paraopeba (CAP) - Ouro Branco
 Campus Centro-Oeste "Dona Lindu" (CCO) - Divinópolis
 Campus Dom Bosco (CDB) - São João del-Rei
 Campus Santo Antônio (CSA) - São João del-Rei
 Campus Sete Lagoas (CSL) - Sete Lagoas
 Campus Tancredo Neves (CTAn) - São João del-Rei
 Fortim dos Emboabas - São João del-Rei 
 Solar da Baronesa (Centro Cultural da UFSJ) - São João del-Rei
 Musicological Reference Center José Maria Neves (Centro de Referência Musicológica José Maria Neves) (CEREM) - São João del-Rei
 Experimental Farm Boa Esperança (Fazenda Experimental Boa Esperança) - São Miguel do Cajuru, São João del-Rei
 Experimental Farm Granja Manoa (Fazenda Experimental Granja Manoa) - Jequitibá

Undergraduate programs
The undergraduate programs are divided among the campuses as follows:

Campus Alto Paraopeba
 Interdisciplinary bachelor's degree of Science and Technology
 Bachelor of Bioprocess Engineering
 Bachelor of Telecommunication Engineering
 Bachelor of Construction Engineering, with emphasis on Metallic Structures
 Bachelor of Mechatronics
 Bachelor of Chemical Engineering

Campus "Dona Lindu"
 Bachelor of Biochemistry
 Bachelor of Nursing
 Bachelor of Pharmacy
 Bachelor of Medicine

Campus Dom Bosco
 Bachelor and Licentiate of Biology Sciences
 Bachelor and Licentiate of Philosophy
 Bachelor and Licentiate of Physics
 Bachelor and Licentiate of History
 Licentiate of English Language
 Licentiate of Portuguese Language
 Bachelor of Medicine
 Licentiate of Pedagogy
 Bachelor of Psychology
 Bachelor and Licentiate of Chemistry

Campus Santo Antônio

 Bachelor of Industrial Engineering
 Bachelor of Electrical Engineering
 Bachelor of Mechanical Engineering
 Licentiate of Mathematics

Campus Tancredo Neves
 Bachelor of Economic Sciences
 Bachelor of Business
 Bachelor of Architecture and Urbanism
 Bachelor of Arts, with emphasis on Pottery
 Bachelor of Computer Science
 Bachelor of Accounting
 Bachelor of Social Communication (Journalism)
 Licentiate of Physical Education
 Bachelor and Licentiate of Geography
 Licentiate of Music
 Bachelor and Licentiate of Fine Arts
 Bachelor of Animal Husbandry

Campus Sete Lagoas
 Interdisciplinary bachelor's degree of Biosystems
 Bachelor of Agronomic Engineering
 Bachelor of Food Engineering
 Bachelor of Forestry Engineering

Graduate programs
The university has several graduate programs as follows:

Campus Alto Paraopeba
 Master of Sustainable Development Technology
 Master of Chemical Engineering

Campus Centro-Oeste "Dona Lindu"
 Master of Biochemistry and Molecular Biology
 PhD of Biochemistry and Molecular Biology
 Master of Biotechnology
 Master of Health Sciences
 PhD of Health Sciences
 Master of Pharmaceutical Sciences
 Master of Nursing

Campus Dom Bosco
 Master of Bioengineering
 PhD of Bioengineering
 Master of Ecology
 Master of Education
 Master of Physics (associated with the Federal University of Lavras and Federal University of Alfenas)
 Master of Physics and Chemistry of Materials
 PhD of Physics and Chemistry of Materials
 Master of History
 Master of Languages
 Master of Psychology
 Master of Chemistry
 PhD of Chemistry

Campus Santo Antônio
 Master of Energy Engineering (associated with Cefet-MG)
 Master of Electrical Engineering (associated with Cefet-MG)
 Master of Mechanical Engineering
 Master of Mathematics

Campus Sete Lagoas
 Master of Agricultural Science

Campus Tancredo Neves
 Master of Geography
 Master Of Music
 Master of Computer Science
 Master of Interdisciplinary Program in Arts, Urbanities and Sustainability

Directors
Executive directors and chancellors of the Federal University of São João del-Rei:

References

External links

 
Programa Institucional de Bioengenharia da UFSJ

Universities and colleges in Minas Gerais
 
Sao Joao